The 1983 Asian Women's Volleyball Championship was the third edition of the Asian Championship, a quadrennial international volleyball tournament organised by the Asian Volleyball Confederation (AVC) with Japan Volleyball Association (JVA). The tournament was held in Fukuoka, Japan from 10 to 17 November 1983.

Final round

Championship

|}

|}

Final standing

References
Results (Archived 2009-05-07)

V
A
Asian women's volleyball championships
Asian Volleyball Championship
Asian Women's Volleyball Championship